is a 2002 Japanese film directed by Hideyuki Hirayama.

Cast
 Kyōzō Nagatsuka as Ippei Kurasawa
 Nene Ohtsuka as Ryoko Kurasawa
 Mickey Curtis as Kiichiro Aisawa
 Jun Kunimura as Akio Yoshizumi
 Kitarō as Kentaro Inamatsu
 Shuzo Mitamura as Keiji Uzaki
 Kumija Kim as Sakiko Inamatsu
 Kaho Minami as Takako Motoyoshi
 Izumi Yukimura as Sanae Inamatsu

Awards
24th Yokohama Film Festival 
Won: Best Director - Hideyuki Hirayama
Won: Best Cinematography
Won: Best Actor - Kyōzō Nagatsuka
Won: Best Supporting Actress - Nene Otsuka
7th Best Film

References

External links
 
 

2002 films
Films directed by Hideyuki Hirayama
2000s Japanese films